The 1999 Survivor Series was the 13th annual Survivor Series professional wrestling pay-per-view (PPV) event produced by the World Wrestling Federation (WWF, now WWE). It took place on November 14, 1999, at the Joe Louis Arena in Detroit, Michigan. It was the second Survivor Series to held at the Joe Louis Arena after the 1991 event.

The main event was a Triple Threat Match (a non-elimination match involving three wrestlers against each other) for the WWF Championship between Triple H, Big Show and The Rock. Big Show was a replacement for Stone Cold Steve Austin, who had been run down by a car earlier in the night (which was an angle for Austin to take time to recover from his injuries). In reality, Austin needed spinal surgery to repair damage stemming from a serious injury he sustained just over two years prior at SummerSlam 1997.

The undercard included the New Age Outlaws defending the WWF Tag Team Championship against Al Snow and Mankind, Chyna defending the Intercontinental Championship against Chris Jericho, three four-on-four Survivor Series elimination match (including a Handicap match involving Big Show), as well as the WWF in-ring debut of Olympic gold medalist Kurt Angle.

Production

Background
Survivor Series is an annual gimmick pay-per-view (PPV), produced every November by the World Wrestling Federation (WWF, now WWE) since 1987. In what has become the second longest-running pay-per-view event in history (behind WWE's WrestleMania), it is one of the promotion's original four pay-per-views, along with WrestleMania, SummerSlam, and Royal Rumble, and was considered one of the "Big Five" PPVs, along with King of the Ring. The event is traditionally characterized by having Survivor Series matches, which are tag team elimination matches that typically pits teams of four or five wrestlers against each other. The 1999 event was the 13th event in the Survivor Series chronology and was scheduled to be held on November 14, 1999, at the Joe Louis Arena in Detroit, Michigan.

Storylines
Survivor Series consisted of professional wrestling matches involving wrestlers from pre-existing feuds and storylines that played out on Raw is War and SmackDown! — WWF's television programs. Wrestlers portrayed a hero or a villain as they followed a series of events that built tension, and culminated in a wrestling match or series of matches.

The main rivalry heading into the event was between Triple H, Stone Cold Steve Austin and The Rock over the WWF Championship. At No Mercy, Rock defeated British Bulldog in a standard wrestling match. Later that night, Rock challenged the winner of the WWF Championship Anything Goes match between Triple H and Stone Cold Steve Austin for the title. After issuing the challenge, Rock was attacked by Triple H with a sledgehammer. Later that night, Triple H defeated Austin to retain the title. On the October 18 episode of Raw is War, Rock challenged Triple H to a match for the title at Survivor Series, because Rock was angered at the previous night's attack. Austin also issued a challenge and claimed that he deserved a title shot instead of Rock. The WWF Chairman Vince McMahon solved the situation by making a Triple Threat match between Triple H, Austin and Rock for the WWF Championship.

Another predominant rivalry heading into the event was between New Age Outlaws (Mr. Ass and Road Dogg) and Al Snow and Mankind for the WWF Tag Team Championship. On the October 18 episode of Raw is War, Mick Foley gave his Rock 'n' Sock Connection partner Rock, a copy of his book "Have A Nice Day!". However, later that night, the same copy was discovered by Al Snow in a trashcan. He informed Foley about it. Foley confronted Rock about it. Rock denied doing so but Foley broke up the Rock 'n' Sock Connection. Later that night, Foley cost Rock and himself, the Tag Team Championship against The Hollys (Hardcore Holly and Crash Holly) by coming out for the match without wearing Mankind gear and leaving Rock to wrestle on his own. This allowed Hollys to defeat Rock and win the titles. On the October 21 episode of SmackDown, Mankind and Rock had a match which ended in a disqualification when Val Venis interfered and attacked Mankind with his book. On the October 25 episode of Raw is War, Mankind wrestled Triple H for the WWF Championship. Triple H was disqualified when Venis assaulted Mankind again, earning Mankind, a disqualification win. However, Al Snow came out to rescue Mankind from the assault. On the October 28 episode of SmackDown, Mankind defeated Venis after distraction from Snow. As a result, Mankind and Snow formed a tag team. On the November 4 episode of SmackDown!, Mankind and Snow defeated The Hollys to win the Tag Team Championship. On the November 8 episode of Raw is War, New Age Outlaws defeated Mankind and Snow for the Tag Team Championship. This led to a title match between New Age Outlaws and Mankind and Snow for the Tag Team Championship.

At No Mercy, Chyna defeated Jeff Jarrett in a Good Housekeeping match to win the WWF Intercontinental Championship. On the October 18 episode of Raw is War, Chyna issued an open challenge, which was answered by Chris Jericho, whose  insults prompted Chyna to attack him. Stevie Richards also got involved in Chyna and Jericho's rivalry. On the November 8 episode of Raw is War, Jericho was scheduled to wrestle Chyna for the Intercontinental Championship at Survivor Series.

On the October 18 episode of Raw is War, Big Boss Man challenged Big Show to a match and agreed to defend the WWF Hardcore Championship. Big Show accepted the challenge. However, before the match Big Show left the arena to check on his father, who had reportedly died (in storyline). The report was later revealed as a plan of Boss Man. On the October 21 episode of SmackDown, an enraged Big Show attempted to attack Boss Man but Boss Man escaped. Big Show then assaulted the police officer. On the October 25 episode of Raw is War, Boss Man distracted Big Show during his match with Prince Albert. Albert attacked Big Show from behind and Boss Man broke Big Show's father's watch with a hammer. As a result, Boss Man and Albert formed a new alliance. On the October 28 episode of SmackDown, Al Snow had a match with Boss Man. However, Boss Man's ally, Albert continuously interfered in the match and the two attacked Snow, leading him to challenge both men to a Hardcore match in the parking lot. Later that night, Boss Man and Albert went to the parking lot to wrestle Snow but instead of Snow, Big Show appeared. He trapped Boss Man and Albert in a car, smashed it into pieces and pushed a dumpster on the top of the car. On the November 1 episode of Raw is War, Boss Man and Albert attacked Big Show during an interview. On the November 8 episode of Raw is War, a tribute was paid to Big Show's father on his death. Boss Man came out and insulted Big Show and his father. On the November 11 episode of SmackDown, footage was shown of Boss Man interrupting the funeral, attacking Big Show and ruining the grave. This led to a Survivor Series match between Big Show's team (consisting of Kai En Tai (Funaki and Taka Michinoku) and The Blue Meanie) and Boss Man's team (consisting of Prince Albert, Viscera and Mideon). On the November 14 episode of Sunday Night Heat, Big Show attacked all of his team members, who withdrew from the team, making the match a 4-on-1 Survivor Series match.

At No Mercy, the Hardy Boyz (Matt Hardy and Jeff Hardy) defeated Edge and Christian in a Ladder match, which was the final round match in a tournament for the managerial services of Terri Runnels and a prize of $100,000. On the October 18 episode of Raw is War, New Brood disbanded their relationship with Gangrel's New Brood stable, turning face in the process, and formed an alliance with their former enemies, Edge and Christian. The Holly Cousins defended the WWF Tag Team Championship against the Hardy Boyz on the October 21 episode of SmackDown and against Edge and Christian on the October 25 episode of Raw is War. In the latter match, Too Cool (Grand Master Sexay and Scotty Too Hotty) interfered, costing Edge and Christian the victory. The Hardy Boyz came out to rescue Edge and Christian and the four wrestlers cleared the ring of Too Cool and Hollys. As a result, the teams of Edge and Christian and Hardy Boyz began a rivalry with Too Cool and Hollys, as the four teams battled each other in several tag team matches and standard wrestling matches, leading to a Survivor Series match at Survivor Series.

On the October 18 episode of Raw is War, The Headbangers (Mosh and Thrasher) distracted The Dudley Boyz (Bubba Ray Dudley and D-Von Dudley) during their match against X-Pac and Kane, costing the Dudley Boyz the match. On the October 25 episode of Raw is War, Dudley Boyz made fun of The Godfather's hos for being attacked by Viscera, after Viscera defeated Godfather in a "Winner Takes Hos" match. The following week on Raw is War, The Headbangers defeated Dudley Boyz in a tag team match. On the November 11 episode of SmackDown, Dudley Boyz defeated Godfather and D'Lo Brown. It led to a Survivor Series match pitting Dudley Boyz and Acolytes Protection Agency (Faarooq and Bradshaw) against Headbangers, Godfather and Brown.

At No Mercy, X-Pac defeated Kane, Faarooq and Bradshaw in a Four Corners Elimination match. As a result of losing to X-Pac, Kane started showing jealousy towards X-Pac and their team started to break up. On the October 28 episode of SmackDown, X-Pac betrayed Kane during a tag team match against Dudley Boyz by low blowing Kane and allowing Dudley Boyz to pin Kane for the win. After the match, X-Pac proclaimed that Kane did not deserve to be a member of D-Generation X, a faction that X-Pac was a part of during that time. On the November 1 episode of Raw is War, the entirety of DX attacked Kane during a match between Kane and X-Pac. This led to a match between Kane and X-Pac at Survivor Series.

At No Mercy, Mae Young helped her friend The Fabulous Moolah in defeating Ivory to win the WWF Women's Championship. On the October 21 episode of SmackDown, Moolah defended the Women's Championship against Young, but Ivory interfered in the match and attacked both Moolah and Young. Jacqueline and Luna joined Ivory in the assault and Tori came out and joined Young and Moolah. On the October 25 episode of Raw is War, Moolah decided to vacate her title and retire from professional wrestling. However, Ivory reminded Moolah of her rematch clause and easily defeated Moolah for the Women's Championship. On the November 11 episode of SmackDown, Ivory, Jacqueline, Luna and Terri Runnels were set to wrestle Moolah, Young, Tori and Debra at Survivor Series.

Throughout November 1999, vignettes aired that hyped the WWF debut of Kurt Angle, who had represented the United States in the 1996 Summer Olympics and won the gold medal in heavyweight freestyle wrestling. His in-ring debut was scheduled for Survivor Series.

Event

Preliminary matches
The pay-per-view opened with a Four-on-four Survivor Series elimination match pitting The Dudley Boyz (Bubba Ray Dudley and D-Von Dudley) and Acolytes Protection Agency (Faarooq and Bradshaw) against The Godfather, D'Lo Brown and The Headbangers (Mosh and Thrasher). Godfather's team suffered the first elimination when Bradshaw pinned Thrasher after performing a Clothesline from Hell. Mosh was eliminated next when the Dudley Boyz hit him with a 3D. Bradshaw was disqualified for hitting Brown with a chair. D-Von took advantage and tried to pin Brown, but Faarooq broke up the pin because he wanted to score the pinfall himself. As a result, Faarooq and D-Von started brawling outside the ring and were counted-out. Bubba Ray, the last remaining member of his team, was double-teamed when Godfather performed a Ho Train, followed by Brown with a Lo Down on Bubba Ray for the victory. As a result, Godfather and Brown were the survivors of their team.

After that, Kurt Angle made his WWF in-ring debut against faced Shawn Stasiak. Stasiak dominated much of the earlier match until Angle escaped the ring and insulted the fans by telling them not to insult an Olympic Gold Medalist. However, Stasiak beat on Angle and then climbed the top rope to perform a Diving Splash, but Angle got up and caught a flying Stasiak by performing an Olympic Slam for the victory.

Another Survivor Series elimination match pitted British Bulldog and Mean Street Posse (Rodney, Pete Gas and Joey Abs) against Val Venis, Mark Henry, Gangrel and Steve Blackman. Blackman eliminated Pete Gas after a Martial Arts Kick. Gangrel then eliminated Rodney with an Impaler. Henry hit a Big Splash on Joey Abs and eliminated him. Bulldog eliminated Gangrel by after a Superplex and Blackman after a Fisherman Suplex. Venis and Henry started double-teaming Bulldog as Henry splashed Bulldog and Venis hit a Money Shot on Bulldog for the victory. Venis and Henry were the survivors on their team.

Next, an eight-woman tag team match pitted Ivory, Luna, Jacqueline and Terri Runnels against Mae Young, The Fabulous Moolah, Tori and Debra. The match went back and forth until Moolah performed a Scoop Slam on Ivory and splashed her to win the match.

After that, Kane fought X-Pac. X-Pac attacked Kane from behind at the end of his signature fiery intro and had the upper hand for a good portion of the match. Kane climbed the top rope, but X-Pac dropkicked him outside the ring. Back in the ring, X-Pac hit Kane with three consecutive Spinning Heel Kicks and then attempted a Bronco Buster, but Kane avoided it and performed a Flying Clothesline and a Chokeslam on X-Pac. Kane attempted a pinfall, but D-Generation X teammate Road Dogg pulled him out of the ring. As Kane rolled back into the ring, he was hit by X-Pac's X-Factor. Kane threw X-Pac away and eventually attempted a Tombstone Piledriver, but Triple H interfered and hit Kane in the face with the WWF Championship belt, thus resulting in a disqualification victory for Kane. Kane was placed in the corner when Tori ran to the ring to stop X-Pac's Bronco Buster. She was kicked in the face as Kane fought off all of the DX members to rescue her. After the match, The Rock was trying to give an interview, but Triple H attacked him. The two brawled until they were separated by several WWF officials.

Next, Big Show faced Big Boss Man, Prince Albert, Mideon and Viscera in a Handicap Survivor Series match. Big Show was the only member on his team because he had attacked all of his teammates prior to the event. However, he single-handedly dominated the match when he eliminated Mideon, Prince Albert and Viscera in under a minute. With all of his teammates eliminated, Boss Man left the ring and ran to the backstage and was counted-out. Big Show won the match and ran after Boss Man to the backstage.

After the match, Triple H interrupted an interview with Stone Cold Steve Austin. Austin started chasing Triple H in the backstage area until a car drove up and ran down Austin at high speed. WWF Chairman Vince McMahon confronted Triple H, D-Generation X and WWF's head of security, but Triple H said that he was not to blame. Austin was loaded into the ambulance and removed from the WWF Championship match against Triple H and Rock.

After that, Chyna defended the Intercontinental Championship against Chris Jericho. They  immediately started attacking each other when Jericho shoved down Chyna's manager Miss Kitty. Both women then kicked Jericho to the outside of the ring as Chyna jumped out and threw Jericho into the stairs. Jericho taunted and teased Miss Kitty throughout the match and even kissed her on one occasion. Kitty started fighting Jericho as Chyna fought back with a Spear and an Irish whip into the ring post. However, Jericho quickly regained momentum and Powerbombed her for a near-fall. Jericho then attempted a Lionsault, but Chyna avoided the move and attacked  Jericho. She then hit Jericho with a DDT and accidentally attacked the referee. Jericho took advantage and nailed Chyna with the championship belt. Chyna hit Jericho with a Pedigree and then attempted a Hurricanrana, but Jericho countered it into a Walls of Jericho. Jericho then placed Chyna on the top rope, but Miss Kitty distracted the referee as Chyna hit Jericho with a Low Blow and a Pedigree from the top turnbuckle to win the match and retain the Intercontinental Championship.

Next, a Survivor Series match pitted Edge and Christian and the Hardy Boyz (Matt Hardy and Jeff Hardy) against Too Cool (Scotty Too Hotty and Grand Master Sexay) and the Holly Cousins (Hardcore Holly and Crash Holly). Hardcore Holly pinned Edge with a Schoolboy and Scotty pinned Matt Hardy after a Tornado DDT. Jeff Hardy pinned Scotty after a 450° Splash but was eliminated after Grand Master Sexay hit a Tennessee Jam. Christian then eliminated Grand Master Sexay after a Diving Reverse DDT and Crash Holly after an Impaler but was quickly pinned by Hardcore Holly with a Victory Roll. Hardcore Holly was the sole survivor.

After that, the New Age Outlaws (Billy Gunn and Road Dogg) defended the WWF Tag Team Championship against Mankind and Al Snow. Mankind and Gunn started exchanging blows until the action spilled outside the ring. Back in the ring, Gunn and Road Dogg quickly tagged in each other as they hurt Snow outside the ring. After being dominated, Snow performed a Clothesline on Road Dogg and tagged in Mankind, while Road Dogg tagged in Gunn. Mankind started dominating until Gunn hit with a Fame-asser. Road Dogg then attempted a Pumphandle Drop on Mankind, but Snow hit him with a Snow Plow. Gunn then threw Al Snow into the steps and hit Mankind with a Texas Piledriver to win the match and retain the Tag Team Championship.

Main event match
In the main event, Big Show was revealed as the substitute for the hospitalized Steve Austin in the Triple Threat match against  WWF Champion Triple H and The Rock. Triple H and Rock started double-teaming Big Show who fought back by clotheslined both opponents. The Rock eventually hit Big Show with a People's Elbow but Triple H attacked Rock. Big Show then hit a Sidewalk Slam on Rock and fought Triple H outside of the ring, where The Rock rejoined the fight. Triple H and The Rock suplexed Big Show onto the Spanish broadcast table and then continued to fight each other in the ring until the referee was knocked out. The Rock then threw Triple H into the top turnbuckle and hit him with a Rock Bottom. The Rock attempt a pinfall but the referee was still out. Finally, Shane McMahon came in as a replacement referee but Triple H kicked out at two. Rock eventually hit another Rock Bottom when Big Show rejoined the action, pulling McMahon out of the ring, attacking The Rock on the broadcast table and hitting Triple H with a stomp, an elbow drop and a legdrop. D-Generation X interfered in the match to help Triple H, but Vince also ran into the ring and hit Triple H with the championship belt. Big Show took advantage and chokeslammed Triple H to win the match and the WWF Championship.

Reception
In 2014, Dylan Diot of 411Mania gave the event a rating of 5.0 [Not So Good], stating, "This show felt more like an episode of Raw than a PPV. All of the classic Survivor Series elimination matches were thrown together, a majority of the show was taken over by the Stone Cold car angle, and the wrestling wasn't all that good with only two exceptions. If [you're] a Big Show fan and want to see his crowning moment since coming to the WWF early in the year, then this show is worth a look. Otherwise, nothing to see here."

Aftermath
After Big Show won the WWF Championship at Survivor Series, he continued his rivalry with Big Boss Man. The next night on Raw, Boss Man defeated The Rock in a Hardcore match, with help from Prince Albert, to become the number one contender for the WWF Championship. At the new December pay-per-view, Armageddon, Big Show defeated Boss Man to retain the title.

Since Stone Cold Steve Austin was hit with a car, the WWF Chairman Vince McMahon continuously blamed Triple H and D-Generation X for the attack. On the November 18 episode of SmackDown, DX assaulted McMahon's Corporate Stooges (Pat Patterson and Gerald Brisco). Sgt. Slaughter informed McMahon of the attack and told McMahon that Triple H had invited him to DX's locker room. McMahon went to the locker room, where Triple H warned McMahon not to make this personal. Later in the night, Triple H came down to the ring and blamed McMahon for his title loss at Survivor Series and then challenged McMahon to a match at Armageddon. Shortly after, footage was shown of backstage where the McMahon family had fallen down the stairs. On the November 22 episode of Raw Is War, Vince destroyed a limousine carrying DX using his car. Although DX retreated, the limousine was destroyed. Later that night, police officers arrested Vince for assaulting DX; Triple H attacked the hand-cuffed Vince and later accused him of orchestrating the attack on Austin at Survivor Series. Shane McMahon came to his father's defense and informed Triple H that Vince would accept Triple H's challenge at Armageddon. On the November 29 episode of Raw Is War, Vince's daughter Stephanie McMahon was supposed to (storyline) marry Test. The ceremony was interrupted by Triple H, who showed a video of himself and an unconscious Stephanie getting married. On the December 2 episode of SmackDown, Triple H announced that his match against Vince at Armageddon would be a No Holds Barred match, and on the following episode of Raw Is War a further stipulation was added to the match. If Vince won the match, Triple H and Stephanie's marriage would be annulled but if Triple H won, he would be granted a WWF Championship match. At Armageddon, Triple H defeated Vince in a No Holds Barred match, after Stephanie betrayed Vince and helped Triple H in finishing Vince with a sledgehammer. It was later revealed that Rikishi had run over Austin on Triple H's orders.

Austin later made his return at Backlash 2000 in April, where he helped The Rock defeat Triple H for the WWF Championship. This was Austin's first appearance since Survivor Series 6 months prior.

Results

Survivor Series elimination matches

References

External links
Official 1999 Survivor Series website

Events in Detroit
1999
1999 in Michigan
Professional wrestling in Detroit
1999 WWF pay-per-view events
November 1999 events in the United States